Fridolf is a masculine given name. The Runic Danish accusative word  may have a connection, although no parallel is attested in the history of Swedish. Notable people with the name include:
Fridolf Heck
Fridolf Lundsten (1884–1947), a Finnish wrestler
Fridolf Jansson (1904–1991), a Swedish politician
Fridolf Martinsson, a Swedish footballer
Fridolf Rhudin
Johan Fridolf Hagfors (1857–1931), a Swedish newspaper publisher and composer

References

German masculine given names
Swedish masculine given names